The 1988 NBA playoffs was the postseason tournament of the National Basketball Association's 1987–88 season. The tournament concluded with the Western Conference champion Los Angeles Lakers defeating the Eastern Conference champion Detroit Pistons 4 games to 3 in the NBA Finals. James Worthy was named NBA Finals MVP.
The Lakers became the first team since the Boston Celtics in 1969 to repeat as champions, a feat that coach Pat Riley guaranteed the previous offseason.

This marked the first time since 1983 that the Celtics did not represent the East in the NBA Finals, but they did win one of the most memorable games of the 1988 playoffs, beating the Hawks 118–116 in Game 7 of the Eastern Conference Semifinals in Boston Garden. Larry Bird scored 20 of his 34 points in the fourth quarter to help Boston overcome the 47 points scored by Dominique Wilkins.

The Dallas Mavericks made their first trip to the Western Conference Finals, losing in 7 to the Lakers. They would not advance that far again until 2003, and would not face the Lakers again until 2011.

The New York Knicks made the playoffs for the first time since 1984. They remained regulars until 2001, which included NBA Finals appearances in 1994 and 1999. On the other hand, the Washington Bullets did not return until 1997, and would not win a playoff game again until 2005 as the Wizards.

In the first round against the Cleveland Cavaliers, Michael Jordan scored 50 or more points twice—50 points in Game 1, and 55 points in Game 2—becoming the first player to do so in the same series.

This was the first time in NBA history that a game other than a Finals game was played during the month of June.

Game 4 of the Hawks-Bucks series was the last game ever played at the MECCA, later known as the US Cellular Arena. The Bucks moved to the Bradley Center the next season; BMO Harris Bank purchased its naming rights in 2012. The Bucks played there for 30 seasons, moving into the Fiserv Forum for the 2018-19 season.

Game 5 of the NBA Finals was the last NBA game ever played at the Pontiac Silverdome.

This was the last NBA postseason to have back-to-backs in the conference finals (they would still occur in the conference semifinals until 2000).

Bracket

First round

Eastern Conference first round

(1) Boston Celtics vs. (8) New York Knicks

This was the 12th playoff meeting between these two teams, with the Celtics winning six of the first 11 meetings.

(2) Detroit Pistons vs. (7) Washington Bullets

This was the second playoff meeting between these two teams, with the Pistons winning the first meeting.

(3) Chicago Bulls vs. (6) Cleveland Cavaliers

This was the first playoff meeting between the Bulls and the Cavaliers.

(4) Atlanta Hawks vs. (5) Milwaukee Bucks

This was the second playoff meeting between these two teams, with the Bucks winning the first meeting.

Western Conference first round

(1) Los Angeles Lakers vs. (8) San Antonio Spurs

This was the fourth playoff meeting between these two teams, with the Lakers winning the first three meetings.

(2) Denver Nuggets vs. (7) Seattle SuperSonics

This was the second playoff meeting between these two teams, with the SuperSonics winning the first meeting.

(3) Dallas Mavericks vs. (6) Houston Rockets

 Cedric Maxwell's final NBA game.

This was the first playoff meeting between the Mavericks and the Rockets.

(4) Portland Trail Blazers vs. (5) Utah Jazz

This was the first playoff meeting between the Trail Blazers and the Jazz.

Conference semifinals

Eastern Conference semifinals

(1) Boston Celtics vs. (4) Atlanta Hawks

This was the ninth playoff meeting between these two teams, with the Celtics winning seven of the first eight meetings.

(2) Detroit Pistons vs. (3) Chicago Bulls

This was the second playoff meeting between these two teams, with the Bulls winning the first meeting.

Western Conference semifinals

(1) Los Angeles Lakers vs. (5) Utah Jazz

 Michael Cooper hits the game-winner with 7 seconds left; John Stockton ties the NBA playoff record for 24 assists.

This was the first playoff meeting between the Lakers and the Jazz.

(2) Denver Nuggets vs. (3) Dallas Mavericks

This was the first playoff meeting between the Mavericks and the Nuggets.

Conference finals

Eastern Conference finals

(1) Boston Celtics vs. (2) Detroit Pistons

 Adrian Dantley hits a game-tying free throw with 10 seconds left in regulation to force OT; Kevin McHale hits the game-tying 3 pointer with 5 seconds left in the first OT to force the second OT.

 Fred Roberts hits the game-tying jumper with 1:05 left in regulation to force OT.

 Artis Gilmore final NBA game

This was the fourth playoff meeting between these two teams, with the Celtics winning the first three meetings.

Western Conference finals

(1) Los Angeles Lakers vs. (3) Dallas Mavericks

This was the third playoff meeting between these two teams, with the Lakers winning the first two meetings.

NBA Finals: (W1) Los Angeles Lakers vs. (E2) Detroit Pistons

 

 Isiah Thomas scores a Finals record 25 points in the 3rd quarter, despite having a severely sprained ankle; Kareem Abdul-Jabbar hits the game-winning free throws with 14 seconds left.

This was the tenth playoff meeting between these two teams, with the Lakers winning eight of the first nine meetings.

References

External links
 Basketball-Reference.com's 1988 NBA Playoffs page

National Basketball Association playoffs
Playoffs
Sports in Portland, Oregon

fi:NBA-kausi 1987–1988#Pudotuspelit